The following is a discography for singer-songwriter Jordan Pruitt.

Studio albums

Singles

Soundtracks 
 2006: "Santa Don't Stop" –  (from Totally Awesome Christmas Vol 1)
 2007: "When She Loved Me" –  (from DisneyMania 5)
 2007: "Celebrate Love " –  (from A Disney Channel Holiday, All Wrapped Up)
 2008: "Ever Ever After" –  (from DisneyMania 6, originally sung by Carrie Underwood for the movie Enchanted)
 2009: "Take To The Sky" –  (from Tinker Bell and the Lost Treasure)
 2009: "This Christmas" –  (from All Wrapped Up Vol.2)

Concert tours 
 2006: The Cheetah Girls The Party's Just Begun Tour (opened for The Cheetah Girls in the first 40 cities) 
 2006–2007: High School Musical: The Concert (opened for the concert High School Musical)
 2007: Six Flags-State Fair Tour (opened for The Jonas Brothers)
 2007: State Fair Tour (opened for Drake Bell and Corbin Bleu)
 2007: Simon D Mall Tour
 2007: Family Channel Spring Break Kickin' It
 2007: The Plain White Tees
 2007: Corbin Bleu and Vanessa Hudgens
 2008: The Tour of Gymnastics Superstars (co-headlined with KSM and Carly Patterson)
 2008: Canada's Wonderland
 2008–2009: Raven-Symoné Live Tour! (opening act)
 2009: Demi Lovato Summer Tour 2009 (opening act)
 2013: Max Schneider and Jordan Pruitt Summer Tour (co-headlined with Max Schneider)

DVDs 
 2007: No Ordinary Girl (Jordan Pruitt Music Videos)
 2007: Air Buddies
 2007: High School Musical: The Concert- Extreme Access Pass
 2009: Radio Disney Jams 11

References 

Discographies of American artists
Pop music discographies